The 1973 FA Cup final was the 92nd final of the FA Cup. It took place on 5 May 1973 at Wembley Stadium and was contested between Leeds United, the previous season's winners and one of the dominant teams in English football at the time, and Sunderland, then playing in the Second Division.

In one of the biggest shocks in the history of the competition, Sunderland won 1–0 to become the first Second Division side to lift the Cup since West Bromwich Albion in 1931. It was Sunderland's last Cup win for almost 50 years until the team won the EFL Trophy in 2021. Sunderland's team were the only FA Cup winners of the 20th century not to field any full internationals, although some of their players were capped later.

Road to Wembley

Match summary

Sunderland established their tactics immediately from the kick-off and refused to be intimidated by their more illustrious opponents, tackling fiercely and defiantly with an unremitting determination. Leeds looked anxious, lacking their usual composure. The match itself was decided by two crucial moments that would be talked about for years to come.

After 32 minutes Sunderland took the lead when Vic Halom chested down a corner from Billy Hughes. Assisted by Dave Watson between two defenders, the deflected high ball was controlled by Ian Porterfield who shot home from 12 yards. Leeds, shocked, battled back with predictable determination. Sunderland's goalkeeper Jimmy Montgomery was outstanding, defying Leeds with a string of fine saves and preserving his team's lead.

The turning point of the match came midway through the second half. Montgomery dived to palm away a close range header from Trevor Cherry. It fell into the path of Lorimer who blasted goalward from 10 yards but Montgomery managed to divert the ball on to the underside of the bar and Malone scrambled the ball clear. The save is considered one of the greatest of all time and has been compared with that made by England's Gordon Banks in the 1970 FIFA World Cup match against Brazil.

The North East team survived more pressure from Leeds to secure a notable upset.

The 1973 showpiece is the last FA Cup final to be played with an orange ball.

Sunderland's FA Cup record, "Sunderland All the Way", was recorded by comedian Bobby Knoxall.

Match details

References

External links

Game facts at soccerbase.com
Match report in "Daily Telegraph"

Final
FA Cup Finals
FA Cup Final 1973
FA Cup Final 1973
Events at Wembley Stadium
FA Cup Final
FA Cup Final